Annie Park (born April 9, 1995) is an American professional golfer who plays on the LPGA Tour. Park has one win on that tour, at the 2018 ShopRite LPGA Classic, and competed in the 2019 Solheim Cup. Previously, she was the 2013 NCAA individual champion and had three victories on the Symetra Tour.

Biography
Born in Levittown, New York, Park began playing golf at the age of 7, and later in her youth she worked with instructor Sean Foley. At the age of 17, Park was the champion of the 2012 Nassau County High School Championship; as one of two women in the 135-player field, she broke the event's scoring record. That year, she played in the U.S. Women's Open. In 2013, Park began playing college golf for the University of Southern California, and won the Pac-12 championship and three other events. At the NCAA Division I Women's Golf Championships, she won the individual title by six strokes and helped USC win the team national championship. Park was named the winner of the Honda Sports Award as the best female college golfer in the U.S.

Park played on the winning U.S. team in the 2014 Curtis Cup. In 2015, following her junior year at USC, she turned professional and joined the Symetra Tour, winning three times in 11 events. Following titles in the Toyota Danielle Downey Classic and the PHC Classic, her third victory came at the Prairie Band Casino & Resort Charity Classic; she became the 10th Symetra Tour player with a three-win season. At the end of the season, Park was the leading money winner on the tour and earned Player of the Year and Rookie of the Year honors, along with full playing privileges on the LPGA Tour for 2016. She played in 25 events during the 2016 LPGA Tour season and had a pair of top-10 finishes. At the ShopRite LPGA Classic, Park tied for sixth, her best result of the year. In addition, she graduated from USC with a communications degree. Towards the end of 2016, though, she had begun to suffer from a back injury.

In 2017, Park's performance declined as she dealt with the injury. She missed the cut in 10 of the 17 tournaments in which she played. After ending 2017 outside the top 120 in season earnings, Park lost full status on the LPGA Tour for 2018, limiting her playing opportunities. At the LPGA Mediheal Championship in April 2018, she gained a spot in the field in a Monday qualifier and finished in a tie for 18th after being within one stroke of the lead following the second round. The result led to an improvement in her playing status for tournament entry, but she did not place better than joint 40th in her next three appearances.

Entering the ShopRite LPGA Classic, Park was number 236 in the Women's World Golf Rankings. At that event, she posted rounds of 69, 65, and 63, for a 16-under-par total that gave her a one-stroke win over Sakura Yokomine, the first of her career on the LPGA Tour. Her winner's check of $262,500 was more than her career earnings at the time. Later in the year, at the Buick LPGA Shanghai, Park finished in a tie for second, one stroke behind winner Danielle Kang. For the season, she made 16 cuts in 19 events and had three top-10 results. Her earnings of nearly $550,000 placed her in 40th on the LPGA's 2018 money list.

In 2019, Park qualified for the U.S. Solheim Cup team based on her position in the Women's World Golf Rankings. She went 1–2–0 in her three matches as the European team defeated the U.S. Park made the cut in 19 of her 25 events during the 2019 season, and finished in the top 10 three times. At the Hugel-Air Premia LA Open in April, she tied for third place, five strokes behind winner Minjee Lee. She earned more than $400,000 in 2019, and ended the year in 50th on the LPGA money list.

During the 2020 LPGA Tour season, which was shortened by the COVID-19 pandemic, Park was 79th on the money list with over $118,000 in earnings. She had one top-10 finish, a sixth-place result in her first event of the year, the Diamond Resorts Tournament of Champions. In 2021, Park made over $123,000, dropping to 103rd in season earnings. She made the cut in 12 of 18 events played but had no top-10 finishes; her top placing was a tie for 12th at the Kia Classic. Park played in 24 tournaments during the 2022 season, making the cut in half of them and posting two top-10s, including a tie for fifth at the Palos Verdes Championship. Her earnings of over $200,000 placed her inside the top 100 on the money list.

Amateur wins
2011 Lessing's AJGA Classic
2013 Bruin Wave Invitational, Pac-12 Championship, NCAA Division I West Regional (tie with Paula Reto), NCAA Division I Championships
2014 NorthropGrumman Regional Challenge, Windy City Collegiate Championship

Source:

Professional wins

LPGA Tour wins (1)

Symetra Tour wins (3)
2015 Toyota Danielle Downey Classic, PHC Classic, Prairie Band Casino & Resort Charity Classic

U.S. national team appearances
Curtis Cup: 2014 (winners)

Results in LPGA majors
Results not in chronological order before 2019.

^ The Evian Championship was added as a major in 2013

CUT = missed the half-way cut
NT = No tournament
"T" = tied

Source:

LPGA Tour career summary

 official through the 2022 season

Team appearances
Professional
Solheim Cup (representing the United States): 2019

Solheim Cup record

Source:

References

External links

American female golfers
USC Trojans women's golfers
LPGA Tour golfers
Golfers from New York (state)
People from Levittown, New York
1995 births
Living people
20th-century American women
21st-century American women